PCCG-4 is a research drug which acts as a selective antagonist for the group II metabotropic glutamate receptors (mGluR2/3), with slight selectivity for mGluR2 although not sufficient to distinguish mGluR2 and mGluR3 responses from each other. It is used in research into the function of the group II metabotropic glutamate receptors.

References

Amino acids
Dicarboxylic acids
Cyclopropanes
MGlu2 receptor antagonists